Preston Davis (born March 10, 1962) is a former American football defensive back who played three seasons with the Indianapolis Colts of the National Football League. He played college football at Baylor University and attended Estacado High School in Lubbock, Texas.

References

External links
Just Sports Stats

Living people
1962 births
Players of American football from Texas
American football defensive backs
African-American players of American football
Baylor Bears football players
Indianapolis Colts players
Sportspeople from Lubbock, Texas
21st-century African-American people
20th-century African-American sportspeople